East Wykeham is a deserted medieval village or DMV, seen as earthworks, in the East Lindsey district of Lincolnshire, England.

East Wykeham is also mentioned in 1316, and formed a single parish with West Wykeham. It became part of Ludford in 1396, and only one family survived in 1563. By 1603-04 the church was in ruins.

Wykeham Hall survived the abandonment of the village, and still stands. The drive passes through the site of East Wykeham. The ruined church, possibly re-built as a folly around 1800, now contains monuments to the Child family of Wykeham Hall.

Gallery

References

Deserted medieval villages in Lincolnshire
Archaeological sites in Lincolnshire